"Riche" is a song by French singer Claudio Capéo. The song was released as a digital download in France on 28 February 2017 by Jo & Co as the third single from his third studio album Claudio Capéo. The song was written by Manon Romiti, Silvio Lisbonne, Nazim Khaled and Mark Hekic. The song peaked at number 27 on the French Singles Chart.

Music video
A video to accompany the release of "Riche" was first released onto YouTube on 1 March 2017 at a total length of four minutes and seven seconds. The video was directed by Hobo & Mojo.

Track listing

Charts

Release history

References

2017 singles
2016 songs
Songs written by Silvio Lisbonne
Songs written by Manon Romiti
Songs written by Nazim Khaled